The Union of Serbia and Montenegro only competed at the Paralympic Games under that name at the 2004 Summer Paralympics in Athens. In 1992, its athletes competed as Independent Paralympic Participants. From 1996 to 2000, included, it was officially known as the Federal Republic of Yugoslavia. The International Paralympic Committee lists the country as "Yugoslavia" up to 2000, included, and considers that "Serbia and Montenegro" participated only in 2004. In 2006, the Union split into two sovereign countries, henceforth competing separately as Serbia and Montenegro.

Going by the IPC's records, Serbia and Montenegro won two bronze medals during its sole Paralympics participation, in 2004. However, Serbian and Montenegrin (Yugoslav) athletes won two gold medals and two silver in 1996, and a single silver medal in 2000, while the Independent Paralympic Participants won four gold, three silver and a bronze in 1992.

Serbia and Montenegro never competed at the Winter Paralympics.

Medalists

Sports

Athletics

Men's track

Men's field

Swimming

Table tennis

See also
Serbia and Montenegro at the Paralympics
Serbia and Montenegro at the 2004 Summer Olympics

References 

Nations at the 2004 Summer Paralympics
2004
Summer Paralympics